Sirk'i (Aymara for wart, also spelled Serkhe) is a  mountain in the Bolivian Andes. It is located in the Cochabamba Department, in the east of the Bolívar Province. Sirk'i lies southeast of Jach'a Khuchi.

References 

Mountains of Cochabamba Department